Robert Weitemeyer (born 5 August 1982 in New Westminster) is a Canadian rower.

References 
 

1982 births
Living people
Canadian male rowers
People from New Westminster
Cambridge University Boat Club rowers

World Rowing Championships medalists for Canada